Little Love Letters is the seventh studio album by American country music artist Carlene Carter, released on June 22, 1993. It had one major Billboard Hot Country Songs hit in the No. 3 "Every Little Thing", and two minor ones in the No. 51 "Unbreakable Heart" and No. 50 "I Love You 'Cause I Want To". The album itself rose to No. 35 on the Top Country Albums chart. "Unbreakable Heart" was later covered by Jessica Andrews on her 1999 debut Heart Shaped World, whose version reached No. 24 on the country singles charts.

Track listing

Personnel
Musicians
 Eddie Bayers — drums, percussion
 Carlene Carter — acoustic guitar, electric guitar, mandolin, autoharp, percussion, vocals
 Buddy Emmons — pedal steel guitar
 Howie Epstein — acoustic guitar, electric guitar, bass guitar, banjo, percussion, background vocals
 Roy Huskey, Jr. — upright bass
 John Jorgenson — acoustic guitar, electric guitar, bass guitar, mandocello, mandolin, slide guitar, clarinet, bassoon, saxophone
 Albert Lee — acoustic guitar, mandolin
 David Lindley — acoustic guitar, banjo, fiddle, mandolin
 Jay Dee Maness — pedal steel guitar
 Phil Parlapiano — accordion, piano
 Joe Romersa — drums, percussion
 Benmont Tench — piano, organ, "various other keyboard-related instruments"
 Willie Weeks — bass guitar

Chorus on "I Love You 'Cause I Want To": NRBQ, Jim Lauderdale, Andy Paley, Kathy Valentine, Dave Edmunds, Susan Cowsill, Phil Parlapiano, Joe Romersa

Technical
 Howie Epstein — production (all tracks)
 John Jorgenson — production ("Sweet Meant to Be" only)
 Irvin Kramer — engineering
 Dale Lavi — photography
Chris Lord-Alge — mixing
 Joe Romersa — engineering
 Ed Seay — engineering

Chart performance

Certifications

Notes 

Carlene Carter albums
1993 albums
Giant Records (Warner) albums